"Ignorantes" is a song by Puerto Rican artist Bad Bunny and Panamanian singer Sech. It was released on February 13, 2020, as the second single from Bad Bunny's second solo studio album YHLQMDLG. The song debuted and peaked at number 3 on the Billboard Hot Latin Songs chart and peaked at number 49 on the Billboard Hot 100.

Composition and lyrics
"Ignorantes" is the first collaboration between Bad Bunny and Sech. The lyrics describe a person who laments a former lover but admits that the relationship wasn't taken seriously. The song contains an interpolation of the 2007 track "No Sé Si Fue" by Arcángel and Zion.

Music video
The music video was released alongside the single on February 13, 2020. It was directed by Cliqua and Stillz. The video showcases different types of couples that represent various races and sexual orientations as it follows closely with the song's theme about ignorant love. Bad Bunny and Sech are also featured in the music video. The video has amassed over 130 million views on YouTube as of June 2020.

Live performances
Bad Bunny and Sech performed "Ignorantes" on The Tonight Show Starring Jimmy Fallon on February 27, 2020. The performance saw Bad Bunny call attention to the murder of Alexa Negrón Luciano, a homeless transgender woman who was killed in San Juan, Puerto Rico in a hate crime four days prior to the performance. Bad Bunny wore a long skirt and a pink jacket during that performance to honor Negrón, as well as a shirt that said "", referring to initial police reports that Negrón was a man in a skirt.

Charts

Weekly charts

Year-end charts

Certifications

References

2020 singles
2020 songs
Bad Bunny songs
Songs written by Bad Bunny
Spanish-language songs
Sech (singer) songs